Robinson Ekspeditionen 2003 was the sixth season of the Danish versions of the Swedish show Expedition Robinson. This season premiered on September 1, 2003 and aired until December 1, 2003. This season was the last to be hosted by the original host of the show, Thomas Mygind. The first twist this season was that two players were to be eliminated on the first day. The first contestant to be eliminated was Lajla Wöhliche Wammen, who was the last person to reach the cage. The second elimination occurred when Anette Kure became the first person to leave the cage. Along with this, this season each team had a chief. The person who was chief was immune at all tribal councils, however, if someone challenged the chief to a duel and the chief lost they would be eliminated and their challenger would become the new chief. A tribal swap in episode 4, saw the creation of new teams as well as the entrance of jokers Ditte Happel and Marinela Malisic into the game. The major twist season was that of "Utopia". When a contestant was eliminated instead of being eliminated, they were sent to Utopia to compete in a duel that would take place when the final three had been decided. When the final three had been decided, twelve eliminated players faced off in a duel in which half were eliminated. The remaining six were then cut down to three when the final three were asked to each select one that they'd like to see return to the game. Those three then competed against the finalists in plank to determine if any of them would return to the game. Ultimately, Hans Helgren won and returned to the game. Another twist was that of the four jokers, David Camacho, Ditte Happel, Mogens Eckert, and Marinela Malisic, who all entered the game at different times during the season. Ultimately, it was Frank Quistgaard who won the season over Rie Pedersen and Marinela Malisic with a jury vote of 7–0–0.

Finishing order

Voting history

External links
http://www.travelape.dk/rob_afsnit.php

Robinson Ekspeditionen seasons
Danish reality television series
2003 Danish television seasons